The Baltimore German was an American soccer club based in Baltimore, Maryland that was a member of the American Soccer League. After their first season, the club was renamed the Baltimore Americans. The Americans won the Lewis Cup in 1947. The league purchased the franchise three games into the 1948/49.

Year-by-year

References

A
Defunct soccer clubs in Maryland
American Soccer League (1933–1983) teams
1917 establishments in Maryland
1949 disestablishments in Maryland
Association football clubs established in 1917
Association football clubs disestablished in 1949